The 2021 Saudi Super Cup (also known as The Berain Saudi Super Cup for sponsorship reasons) was the 8th edition of the Saudi Super Cup, an annual football match played between the winners of the previous season's Saudi Pro League and King's Cup. It was played on 6 January 2022 at the Prince Faisal bin Fahd Stadium, Riyadh, between Al Hilal and Al Faisaly.

Al-Hilal defeated Al-Faisaly 2–2 (4–3 on penalties) to win their third title. Al-Hilal then became the most successful team in the Super Cup, surpassing Al-Nassr's two titles.

Venue
The King Fahd International Stadium was originally announced as the venue of the final on 15 September 2021. However, on 31 December, it was announced that the match would instead take place at the Prince Faisal bin Fahd Stadium in Riyadh. This will be the first Super Cup to be held at the stadium

The Prince Faisal bin Fahd Stadium was built in 1969 and opened in 1971 with the King Cup final between Al-Shabab and Al-Ahli being the opener. The stadium was used as a venue for many domestic cup finals and the 1972 Arabian Gulf Cup. Its current capacity is 22,500 and it is used by the Saudi Arabia national football team, Al-Hilal, and Al-Shabab.

Background

As part of the running sponsorship deal between the Saudi Arabian Football Federation (SAFF) and Saudi water company Berain, the match will be officially referred to as "The Berain Saudi Super Cup".

This was Al-Hilal's fifth appearance in the competition and second consecutive one. Al-Hilal won the title twice, in 2015 and 2018, and finished as runners-up twice, in 2016 and 2020. This was Al-Faisaly's first appearance in the competition.

Al-Hilal qualified by winning the 2020–21 Saudi Professional League on 23 May 2021. Al-Faisaly qualified after winning their first ever King Cup title on 27 May 2021.

This was the first meeting between these two sides in the Saudi Super Cup and the first-ever meeting between them in a cup final. This was the 34th competitive meeting between the two with the first meeting dating back to 20 March 1975. Al-Hilal won 26 times while the two teams drew seven times. Al-Faisaly have never beaten Al-Hilal in a competitive match before. The two teams met once in the 2021–22 season with Al-Hilal coming back from 2–0 down to win the match 3–2.

Match

Details

{| width="100%"
|valign="top" width="40%"|

Statistics

See also
 2020–21 Saudi Professional League
 2020–21 King Cup
 2021 King Cup Final

References

External links

Saudi Super Cup
2021–22 in Saudi Arabian football
Sports competitions in Saudi Arabia
January 2022 sports events in Saudi Arabia
Al Hilal SFC matches
Al-Faisaly FC
Saudi Super Cup 2021